Rokci may refer to:

 Rokci (Aleksandrovac), a village in Serbia
 Rokci (Ivanjica), a village in Serbia